Sulaco may refer to:

Places
 Sulaco, Yoro, a municipality in Honduras
 Sulaco Airport (IATA code: SCD, IATA code: MHUL), see List of airports by IATA code: S
 Sulaco River, a river in Honduras

Fictional locations
 Sulaco, Costaguana -- The mining town of the Joseph Conrad novel Nostromo

Vehicles
 SS Sulaco, a British cargo ship sunk in WWII, see List of shipwrecks in October 1940
 SS Sulaco, a cargo and passenger ship, final name of the USS Talamanca (AF-15)

Fictional vehicles
 U.S.S. Sulaco, a fictional spaceship shown in the movie Aliens